The 2023 NHL Stadium Series was an outdoor regular season National Hockey League (NHL) game, part of the Stadium Series of games. The game took place on February 18, 2023, at Carter–Finley Stadium in Raleigh, North Carolina, with the Carolina Hurricanes hosting the Washington Capitals. The Hurricanes were originally scheduled to host the 2021 Stadium Series but the game was canceled due to the COVID-19 pandemic.

Background
After he took majority control of the team in 2018, Hurricanes owner Thomas Dundon made it a goal to have his club play in its first outdoor game. In 2019, Dundon invited NHL Commissioner Gary Bettman to take a tour of Carter–Finley Stadium to see if it was feasible. On February 15, 2020, the league initially announced that the Hurricanes would host the 2021 Stadium Series. Before the league could finalize the game, the Hurricanes sought additional funding of $200,000 from the local government and other organizations to help offset the cost of hosting the game.

The COVID-19 pandemic forced the league to delay the conclusion of the 2019–20 playoffs until late September, and consequently push the start of the 2020–21 season to January 2021. On October 22, 2020, the NHL announced that it had postponed both the 2021 NHL Winter Classic and the 2021 All-Star Game due to "ongoing uncertainty" since both January events rely on fan participation. The decision to further postpone the 2021 Stadium Series game was made on December 23.

The Hurricanes later asked the league to move their outdoor game to the 2022–23 season, with team president and general manager Don Waddell stating that he wanted "to assure a safe environment". On February 4, 2022, the league confirmed that the Hurricanes would host the 2023 game, and later announced on March 3, 2022, that the Washington Capitals would be the opponent.

The game was Carolina's first outdoor game and Washington's fourth.

Game summary

Carolina controlled most of the game, scoring the first four goals en route to a 4-1 win. Martin Necas scored a goal and two assists, Jesperi Kotkaniemi and Teuvo Teravainen each scored a goal and an assist, Paul Stastny had a goal, and Frederik Andersen made 24 out of 25 saves and had an assist. Tom Wilson scored Washington's lone goal in the third period.

Number in parentheses represents the player's total in goals or assists to that point of the season

Team rosters

 Charlie Lindgren and Antti Raanta dressed as the back-up goaltenders.  Neither entered the game.

Scratches
Washington Capitals: Alexander Alexeyev, Aliaksei Protas, Joe Snively
Carolina Hurricanes: Dylan Coghlan

Broadcasting
The game was broadcast nationally in the United States by ABC/ESPN+ and was simulcast in Canada via Sportsnet.

References

NHL Stadium Series
Stadium Series
NHL Stadium Series
NHL Stadium Series
Carolina Hurricanes games
Washington Capitals games
Ice hockey in North Carolina
Sports competitions in Raleigh, North Carolina